Powerlifting at the 2016 Summer Paralympics was held at Riocentro from September, with a maximum of 180 athletes (100 men and 80 women), competing in 20 events. According to the classification rules of the International Federation for Powerlifting athletes which cannot participate in weightlifting events because of a physical impairment affecting their legs or hips are deemed eligible to compete in powerlifting events at the Paralympics.

Events
There are twenty powerlifting events, corresponding to ten weight classes each for men and women. The weight categories were significantly adjusted after the 2012 Games so most of the weights are new for 2016.

Qualification

There were 120 male and 80 female competitors. The bulk of the quota places will be decided by reference to the IPC Powerlifting Rankings on 29 February 2016. Subject to a quota limit of one place per National Paralympic Committee, the top 8 ranked male, and top 6 ranked female athletes in each weight division will gain a quota place for their NPC. If they are the only lifter from their NPC in that list, that lifter shall gain the place; if an NPC has two or more lifters in quota place ranking position, the choice of lifter will be for the NPC from that number.

Two further quota places per event will be awarded by the Bipartite Commission.

The following is a summary of the qualification places at the 2016 Summer Paralympic Powerlifting event.

Schedule

Medal summary

Medal table

Men's events

Women's events

References

External links 
 Paralympic Powerlifting - Rio 2016 Summer Paralympics 

 
2016 Summer Paralympics events
Paralympics
International weightlifting competitions hosted by Brazil